Lyceum '72 is a live album by the country rock band the New Riders of the Purple Sage. It was recorded at the Lyceum Theatre in London on May 26, 1972. It was released on CD on September 23, 2022.  It is scheduled to be released as a three-disc LP on April 22, 2023.

At this concert, the New Riders were the opening act for the Grateful Dead, who were playing the final show of their Europe '72 tour. The Dead's performance from this date is documented on the album Lyceum Theatre, London, England 5/26/72.

Critical reception 
In Glide Magazine Doug Collette wrote, "While it's fair to say the New Riders were certainly hitting their collective stride at this point, they were nowhere near complacent... Yet the sound forged by the quintet on exhibit here is all the more authentic given how they revel in it (albeit in an understated fashion); it's validation of why the group remained a logical opening act for [the Grateful Dead] long past the early points when the NRPS lineup featured members of the Dead."

Track listing 
"Leaving On Her Mind" (Jack Clement) – 2:52
"Whatcha Gonna Do" (John Dawson) – 3:32
"Hello Mary Lou" (Gene Pitney, Cayet Mangiaracina) – 3:02
"Lochinvar" (Dawson) – 5:13
"Truck Drivin' Man" (Terry Fell) – 3:11
"Glendale Train" (Dawson) – 5:06
"California Day" (Dave Torbert) – 2:54
"Duncan and Brady" (traditional, arranged by John Koerner) – 5:35
"Dim Lights, Thick Smoke (And Loud, Loud Music)" (Joe Maphis, Max Fidler, Rose Lee) – 3:52
"I Don't Need No Doctor" (Nick Ashford, Valerie Simpson, Jo Armstead) – 6:09
"Rainbow" (Dawson) – 3:47
"Connection" (Mick Jagger, Keith Richards) – 4:31
"Sailin'" (Dawson) – 4:30
"Dirty Business" (Dawson) – 9:01
"Last Lonely Eagle" (Dawson) – 5:42
"Louisiana Lady" (Dawson) – 4:26
"Honky Tonk Women" (Jagger, Richards) – 4:59

Personnel 
New Riders of the Purple Sage
John Dawson – guitar, vocals
David Nelson – guitar, vocals
Dave Torbert – bass guitar, vocals
Buddy Cage – pedal steel guitar
Spencer Dryden – drums
Production
Produced by Rob Bleetstein
Recording: Betty Cantor, Janet Furman, Bob Matthews, Rosie, Wizard
Mixing: Jeffrey Norman
Mastering: David Glasser
Liner notes: Sam Cutler
Cover art: Kevin Morgan Studio
Design, layout: Greg Allen

References 

New Riders of the Purple Sage live albums
2022 live albums